Otocryptis wiegmanni, commonly called the brown-patched kangaroo lizard, Sri Lankan kangaroo lizard or Wiegmann's agama, is a small, ground-dwelling agamid lizard endemic to Sri Lanka.

Etymology
The specific name, wiegmanni, is in honour of German herpetologist Arend Friedrich August Wiegmann.

Habitat
It is commonly seen in the leaf litter of shady rain forests.

Defensive behaviour
When perceiving danger, O. wiegmanni spurts away quickly on its large hind legs and might eventually climb up a sapling or tree.

Diet
O. wiegmanni feeds on small insects, grubs, and tender shoots.

Taxonomy
O. wiegmanni is closely related to the Indian kangaroo lizard (O. beddomii ) of the rain forests of South India.

Description
Its colour ranges from dark reddish brown to dull brown. Males are darker than females. Males have a maroon patch on their gular sac.

Reproduction
Male O. wiegmanni are territorial and can defend their territory against intruders through displays and fights. Females lay between three and five eggs in a nest in the ground between July and January, with a peak between October and January. Hatchlings emerge after 57–70 days.

References

External links

Description
Picture gallery
Picture gallery II

Further reading
Boulenger GA (1885). Catalogue of the Lizards in the British Museum (Natural History). Second Edition. Volume I ... Agamidæ ... London: Trustees of the British Museum (Natural History). (Taylor and Francis, printers). xii + 436 pp. + Plates I-XXXII. (Otocryptis bivittata, pp. 271–272).
Smith MA (1935). The Fauna of British India, Including Ceylon and Burma. Reptilia and Amphibia. Vol. II.—Sauria. London: Secretary of State for India in Council. (Taylor and Francis, printers). xiii + 440 pp. + Plate I + 2 maps. (Otocryptis wiegmanni, pp. 146–147).

Otocryptis
Reptiles of Sri Lanka
Endemic fauna of Sri Lanka
Taxa named by Johann Georg Wagler
Reptiles described in 1830